Pseudolilliconus korni is a species of sea snail, a marine gastropod mollusk in the family Conidae, the cone snails and their allies.

Like all species within the genus Conus, these snails are predatory and venomous. They are capable of "stinging" humans, therefore live ones should be handled carefully or not at all.

Description
The size of the shell varies between 4 mm and 13 mm.

Distribution
This marine species occurs in the Gulf of Aden and off Somalia.

References

 Raybaudi Massilia G. (1993). From the Gulf of Aden and Somalia: Conus (Leptoconus) korni n. sp. La Conchiglia. 25(267): 24-28, 19 figs.
 Tucker J.K. & Tenorio M.J. (2009) Systematic classification of Recent and fossil conoidean gastropods. Hackenheim: Conchbooks. 296 pp.
 Monnier E., Limpalaër L., Robin A. & Roux C. (2018). A taxonomic iconography of living Conidae. Harxheim: ConchBooks. 2 vols. 1205 pp

External links
 Puillandre N., Duda T.F., Meyer C., Olivera B.M. & Bouchet P. (2015). One, four or 100 genera? A new classification of the cone snails. Journal of Molluscan Studies. 81: 1–23
 The Conus Biodiversity website
 
 Cone Shells - Knights of the Sea

korni
Gastropods described in 1993